Yankı Erel (born 25 September 2000) is a Turkish tennis player.

Erel has a career high ATP singles ranking of World No. 536 achieved on 25 October 2021. He also has a career high ATP doubles ranking of World No. 655 achieved on 8 November 2021.

Erel won the 2018 Wimbledon Championships – Boys' doubles title. On the juniors tour, Erel has a career high ITF junior combined ranking of 16, achieved on 16 July 2018.

Junior Grand Slam titles

Doubles: 1 (1 title)

ATP Challenger and ITF Futures finals

Singles: 4 (4–0)

Doubles: 2 (1–1)

External links
 
 
 

2000 births
Living people
Turkish male tennis players
People from Tekirdağ
Wimbledon junior champions
Tennis players at the 2018 Summer Youth Olympics
Grand Slam (tennis) champions in boys' doubles
21st-century Turkish people